K132, or similar, may refer to:

K-132 (Kansas highway), a former state highway in Kansas
HMS Vetch (K132), a former UK Royal Navy ship
Russian submarine Irkutsk (K-132)
Symphony No. 19 (Mozart) in E♭ major, by Mozart
IKCO Tara, a car